This was the first edition of the event and was won by Kevin King and Juan-Carlos Spir.

Seeds

Draw

References
 Main Draw

Visit Panamá Cup de Chitré Doubles
2014 Doubles